Adhari Park is an amusement park in the Kingdom of Bahrain based around the historic freshwater spring known as Ain Adhari which is located around the Zinj area. In 2003, the site was remodeled and it became a major tourist attraction. In 2006, it was remodeled at a cost of over $23,000,000 US dollars. In 2007, the park is projected to receive over a million visitors. It had opened to the public in 2008 and covers an area of 165,000 square meters. It has 8 outdoor and indoor rides for people of all ages, a Family Entertainment Centre, 1 food outlet at the Food Court, dine in restaurant, and coffee shops.. It has 1200 parking spaces.

See also 
List of tourist attractions in Bahrain

References 

Entertainment venues in Bahrain
Tourism in Bahrain